Chaloult is a surname.  Notable people with the surname include:

 Dominique Chaloult, Canadian television executive
 René Chaloult (1901–1978), Canadian politician